Andrej Atanasov (born 18 November 1997) is a Macedonian professional basketball Shooting guard who currently plays for Crn Drim in the Macedonian First League.

External links
 aba-liga Profile
 FIBA Profile
 RealGM Profile
 balkanleague.net

References

1997 births
Sportspeople from Skopje
Macedonian men's basketball players
Living people
Shooting guards